Marcelo René Bravo (born 10 January 1985) is a former Argentine football coach and former player who played as a midfielder. He is the current manager of Vélez Sarsfield's youth setup.

Bravo played 50 games with Vélez Sarsfield, being a key member of the 2005 Clausura winning squad, and played for the Argentine U-20 national team before retiring at the age of 21 after discovering that he suffered from a cardiovascular hypertrophy. His illness is similar to the one that cost fellow footballer Antonio Puerta's life in 2007.

Playing career

Club

Bravo only played at club level for Vélez Sarsfield in the Primera División Argentina. He started his professional career in 2003 and retired in 2006, immediately after the club's doctors discovered his illness. He played 16 games and scored 3 goals in Vélez' 2005 Clausura winning campaign, being a regular on the team's left wing. His last game came during the 2006 Apertura in a 6-0 victory over Gimnasia y Esgrima de La Plata, where he scored one goal.

International

Bravo was part of the Argentine under-20 squad that came third in the 2005 South American Youth Championship held in Colombia. He was a substitute in a team where, among others, played Lionel Messi.

Post-playing career
Immediately after retiring, Vélez offered Bravo a position in Miguel Ángel Russo's coaching staff. In an interview given in 2006 he stated:

 He then went on to coach in Vélez's youth divisions.

On 26 February 2023, Bravo and Hernán Manrique were named interim managers of Vélez, after Alexander Medina left.

Honours
Primera División Argentina (1): 2005 Clausura

See also

 Antonio Puerta

References

External links
  
 

1985 births
Sportspeople from Buenos Aires Province
Argentine footballers
Club Atlético Vélez Sarsfield footballers
Argentine Primera División players
Living people
Association football wingers
Argentine football managers
Club Atlético Vélez Sarsfield managers